Stone Tavern is an unincorporated community located on the border of Millstone and Upper Freehold townships in Monmouth County, New Jersey, United States.

The community took its name from a stone tavern once called Britton's Tavern. Today the area, located along County Route 524 at the Millstone–Upper Freehold township line, consists mainly of single-family homes in forested rolling terrain.

References

Millstone Township, New Jersey
Upper Freehold Township, New Jersey
Unincorporated communities in Monmouth County, New Jersey
Unincorporated communities in New Jersey